Maryland Route 277 (MD 277) is a state highway in the U.S. state of Maryland. The highway runs  from Elk Mills east to MD 279 near Elkton in northeastern Cecil County. MD 277 was constructed west of MD 316 in the early 1920s. The highway was planned to be extended in both directions in the late 1940s. However, neither extension occurred until MD 277 was extended east to MD 279 in the mid-1980s.

Route description

Elk Mills Road continues west as a county highway toward MD 213. MD 277 heads east as a two-lane undivided road through residential areas of the community and has a grade crossing of CSX's Philadelphia Subdivision railroad line. The highway crosses over Big Elk Creek and passes along the northern edge of the Elk Mills Quarry before intersecting Appleton Road, which heads south as MD 316 and north as a county highway. MD 277 continues east as Fletchwood Road through suburban areas and woods, passing to the north of warehouses. The route briefly parallels the West Branch Christina River as the river passes through Fletchwood Community Park located north of the road. The highway reaches its eastern terminus at MD 279 (Elkton Road) northeast of the town of Elkton and just west of the Delaware state line.

History

Elk Mills Road was constructed as a  concrete road from Appleton Road (then named Barksdale Road) to the current western terminus in 1921. In 1945, Cecil County requested the highway be extended west to MD 280 (now MD 213) and east to MD 279 in the first year of a three-year post–World War II construction program. The extensions of MD 277 were planned to be placed under contract in 1947. However, the highway from MD 316 to MD 279 was later proposed to be paved by the state but remain a county highway, and the highway west to MD 280 disappeared from improvement plans. MD 277's old bridge across Big Elk Creek was replaced with a steel beam bridge in 1968, and the highway was paved with bituminous concrete in 1973. Almost 40 years after it was proposed, MD 277 was extended east to MD 279 when Fletchwood Road was transferred from county maintenance in a May 16, 1984, road transfer agreement. The Fletchwood Road portion of the highway was reconstructed between 1990 and 1992.

Junction list

See also

References

External links

MDRoads: MD 277
MD 277 at AARoads.com

277
Maryland Route 277